Jamalpur-1 is a constituency represented in the Jatiya Sangsad (National Parliament) of Bangladesh since 2008 by Abul Kalam Azad of the Awami League.

Boundaries 
The constituency encompasses Baksiganj and Dewanganj upazilas.

History 
The constituency was created in 1978 a Mymensingh constituency when the former Mymensingh District was split into two districts: Jamalpur and Mymensingh.

Members of Parliament

Elections

Elections in the 2010s

Elections in the 2000s

Elections in the 1990s

References

External links
 

Parliamentary constituencies in Bangladesh
Jamalpur District